The , simply known as the , is a museum created by Japan's Science and Technology Agency.

It was opened in 2001. It is situated in a purpose-built building in the Odaiba District of Tokyo. It can be reached by the Yurikamome driverless fully automated transit system from downtown Tokyo in about 15 minutes.

Exhibits
Highlights include real-time displays of data from a huge array of seismometers across Japan which shows the country gently vibrating. The occasional earthquakes for which Japan is noted show up as larger movements. Visitors can search the on-line database of recent earthquake activity.

A section of rock core taken across the Cretaceous–Paleogene boundary (K–T boundary) records a major meteorite impact event that is believed to have led to the final demise of the dinosaurs. Asimo, the Honda robot is one of the star attractions along with the model maglev train.

Geo-Cosmos
The prominent Geo-Cosmos high resolution globe displays near real-time events of global weather patterns, ocean temperatures and vegetation cover among other geographic, scientific and socioeconomic topics. The Geo-Cosmos spherical screen consists of 10,362 OLED panels, each 96 x96 mm in size. The first and only one of its kind was rebuilt in 2010 and re-introduced in its current form in June 2011, after the Tohoku earthquake caused the museum to close for three months. US President Barack Obama visited Miraikan on April 24, 2014, addressing Japanese students in front of the Geo-Cosmos display. Noting the uniqueness of the display, he said: "As far as I know, we don't have one of those cool globes..."

The Geo-Cosmos along with Geo-Palette and Geo-Scope is part of the Tsunagari permanent exhibition.

Geo-Palette
Miraikan adopted a unique map projection called AuthaGraph projection as its official world mapping tool. AuthaGraph projection was developed by Japanese architect Hajime Narukawa in 1999. "This projection method transfers a 3-dimentional  sphere into a 2-dimensional rectangle while maintaining areas proportions. Using this method, the 'AuthaGraph world map' succeeds in transferring an image of the spherical Earth to a flat surface while evenly distributing distortion."

Special exhibitions
Every year between three and six specially curated exhibitions are produced and shown, with science and art often overlapping. They dealt with a wide range of topics from "Toilet - Human Waste and Earth's Future" to the "Making of the Tokyo Sky Tree"  and "Terminator Exhibition - Battle or Coexistence? Robots and Our Future". In 2012, the special exhibition "The Story of the End of the World: 73 Questions We Must Answer" dealt with the Tohoku earthquake and its aftermath.

Multilingual staff conduct demonstrations about leading edge Japanese science. Miraikan is led by Japanese astronaut Mamoru Mohri.

Gallery

See also
 List of museums in Tokyo

References

External links
 https://vimeo.com/118784283

Sources

 Miraikan website in Japanese
 Miraikan website in English

Buildings and structures in Koto, Tokyo
Odaiba
Museums in Tokyo
Science museums in Japan
Museums established in 2001
2001 establishments in Japan